Sander De Erit Severino (June 30, 1985) is a Filipino chess player holding the title of FIDE Master. He participated at the 2018 Asian Para Games.

Career
Born on June 30, 1985, Sander De Erit Severino is a native of Silay, Negros Occidental. Severino was diagnosed with amyotrophic lateral sclerosis (ALS) when he was eight years old after a bicycle accident. Reliant on a wheelchair, both of his legs are paralyzed due to this condition.

The Silay native started playing chess competitively at age seven and has become a regional champion at age 9 and the National Kiddies Champion at age 11. Severino along with Henry Roger Lopez and Jasper Rom participated at the 2000 Millennium Grand Prix chess tournament sponsored by the Philippine Chess Society. Executive Vice President of the Social Security System Horacio Templo has sponsored the participation of disabled athletes in the chess tournament including the trio who did well in the competition. In late December 2000, Severino won the Asian Continental Under-16 Championship in Bagac, Bataan, with his participation sponsored again by the SSS  Thanks to this victory, he earned the title of FIDE Master. FIDE awarded him the title in 2015.

Sander Severino has participated in seven editions of the ASEAN Para Games. In the 2017 edition held in Kuala Lumpur he won a gold medal.

At the 2018 Asian Para Games in Jakarta, the chess team which Severino is a part of won most of the ten gold medals won by the whole Philippine contingent. Severino himself won the individual standard P1 and individual rapid P1 events and the team standard P1 and team rapid B1 events along with Lopez and Rom.

In 2020, Severino clinched the International Physically Disabled Chess Association (IPCA) World Online Chess Rapid Championship title becoming the first player representing the Philippines to do so. He was undefeated winning the finals against Igor Yarmonov of Ukraine garnering 8.5 points through 8 victories and a draw.

References

References

1985 births
Living people
Filipino chess players
Chess FIDE Masters
People with paraplegia
Filipino people with disabilities
People from Silay
ASEAN ParaGames competitors
Place of birth missing (living people)